Samuel Leland Powers (October 26, 1848 – November 30, 1929) was a United States representative from Massachusetts.

Early life
Powers was born in Cornish, New Hampshire on October 26, 1848.  He attended Kimball Union Academy and graduated from Dartmouth College in 1874.  Powers studied law at the University of the City of New York Law School, and also in Worcester, Massachusetts. He was admitted to the bar in Worcester County in November, 1875 and at that time commenced practice in Boston, and moved to Newton.

Political career
Powers was a member of the Newton City Council, also serving as its president. Powers was elected as a Republican to the Fifty-seventh and Fifty-eighth Congresses (March 4, 1901 – March 3, 1905). He declined to be a candidate for renomination in 1904. He served as one of the managers appointed by the House of Representatives in 1905 to conduct the impeachment proceedings against Charles Swayne, judge of the United States District Court for the Northern District of Florida.

He then resumed the practice of law in Boston, became a trustee of Dartmouth College 1905-1915, was a member of the Massachusetts Board of Education in 1915-1919, served in the State militia for ten years.  He was a member of the Ancient and Honorable Artillery Company of Massachusetts.

In 1916 the Massachusetts legislature and electorate approved a calling of a Constitutional Convention. In  May 1917, Powers was elected to serve as a member of the Massachusetts Constitutional Convention of 1917, representing the Massachusetts Thirteenth Congressional District.

Powers was a member of the University, Exchange, Newton and Atlantic Conference Clubs, among others and was the president of the Boston Art Club. and was a trustee of the board of public control for the operation of the Boston Elevated Railway 1918-1928, serving as chairman 1923-1928.

Death
Powers died in Newton on November 30, 1929. His interment was in Newton Cemetery in Newton Center.

References

External links
 
 

1848 births
1929 deaths
People from Cornish, New Hampshire
Dartmouth College alumni
Politicians from Worcester, Massachusetts
Politicians from Boston
Members of the 1917 Massachusetts Constitutional Convention
Politicians from Newton, Massachusetts
Massachusetts city council members
Republican Party members of the United States House of Representatives from Massachusetts
American Unitarians